Yerenman Salazar (born October 24, 1978) is a Venezuelan racewalker. He competed at the 2016 Summer Olympics in the men's 50 kilometres walk but did not finish the race.

References

1978 births
Living people
Venezuelan male racewalkers
Olympic athletes of Venezuela
Athletes (track and field) at the 2016 Summer Olympics
20th-century Venezuelan people
21st-century Venezuelan people